KDEN-TV (channel 25) is a television station licensed to Longmont, Colorado, United States, broadcasting the Spanish-language Telemundo network to the Denver area. Owned and operated by NBCUniversal's Telemundo Station Group, KDEN-TV maintains studios at the Comcast Media Center on East Dry Creek Road in Centennial, and its transmitter is located in rural southwestern Weld County (east of Frederick).

History
The station first signed on the air on March 31, 1997. Founded by locally owned Longmont Broadcasting, KDEN originally operated as an independent station. On January 19, 2006, Longmont Broadcasting sold KDEN to NBC Universal, making the second television station in the Denver market to have been an owned-and-operated station under NBC ownership—after KCNC-TV (channel 4, now a CBS owned-and-operated station), which was owned by the network from 1986 to 1995, the company's 17th Spanish-language television station and the third network O&O in the market overall (alongside KCNC and KDVR (channel 31), which Fox would eventually sell in 2008).

Channel 25 became the market's Telemundo owned-and-operated station on March 6, Before moving to KDEN, Telemundo programming was seen in Denver on low-power stations KMAS-LP (channel 63) and KSBS-LP (channel 47), which both served as repeaters of KMAS-TV (channel 24) in Steamboat Springs; after NBC Universal purchased KDEN, it donated the KMAS-TV license and transmitter facility to Rocky Mountain PBS, which changed its call letters to KRMZ, while KSBS-LP was sold to Denver Digital Television (NBC retained KMAS-LP, which moved to channel 33 in 2008, was converted to digital station KMAS-LD in 2012, and remained a repeater of KDEN-TV until its license was cancelled on December 6, 2019).

Newscasts
KDEN-TV presently broadcasts five hours of locally produced newscasts each week (with one hour each weekday); the station does not broadcast local newscasts on Saturdays or Sundays. Upon affiliating with Telemundo, KDEN aired locally produced news cut-ins during the national evening newscasts Noticiero Telemundo and Noticiero Telemundo Internacional; the inserts were discontinued late that year as a result of budget cutbacks imposed by NBC Universal.

On July 29, 2011, KDEN announced a news share agreement with NBC affiliate KUSA (channel 9) to produce Spanish-language newscasts for the station. The half-hour newscasts, airing at 5:30 and 10:00 p.m. weeknights and branded as Noticiero Telemundo Denver/9News en Español, debuted on October 3, 2011 and utilize a separate on-air staff that is exclusive to the KDEN broadcasts; the programs are produced out of a secondary set at KUSA's studio facility on East Speer Boulevard, and have been broadcast in high-definition from their launch.

On October 20, 2014, KDEN added a 4:30 newscast and moved its 5:30 show to 5:00 p.m. In July 2015, the station began producing its own newscasts from the Comcast Media Center in Centennial, retaining a content partnership with KUSA. As a result, the KDEN news staff grew from four people prior to the move to 18 in 2016. KDEN is one of the 11 Telemundo owned and operated stations that do not produce midday newscasts.

Technical information

Subchannels
The station's digital signal is multiplexed:

Analog-to-digital conversion
KDEN-TV shut down its analog signal, over VHF channel 25, on June 12, 2009, the official date in which full-power television stations in the United States transitioned from analog to digital broadcasts under federal mandate. The station's digital signal remained on its pre-transition UHF channel 29. Through the use of PSIP, digital television receivers display the station's virtual channel as its former UHF analog channel 25.

References

External links
 

Television channels and stations established in 1997
1997 establishments in Colorado
DEN-TV
Telemundo Station Group
Cozi TV affiliates
DEN-TV
TeleXitos affiliates
LX (TV network) affiliates